Brachodes appendiculata is a moth of the family Brachodidae. It is found in Austria, the Czech Republic, Slovakia, Slovenia, former Yugoslavia, Hungary, Italy, Romania, Ukraine, Russia and the Near East.

The wingspan is about 24 mm. The forewings are yellowish brown and the hindwings are white.

The larvae have been recorded feeding on Festuca ovina.

References

Moths described in 1783
Brachodidae
Moths of Europe
Moths of Asia